El Casar de Escalona is a village in the province of Toledo and autonomous community of Castile-La Mancha, Spain.

References

Municipalities in the Province of Toledo
Populated places in the Province of Toledo